David Sánchez Parrilla (born 13 December 1978) is a Spanish retired footballer who played as a right back.

External links
 
 

1978 births
Living people
Sportspeople from Tarragona
Spanish footballers
Footballers from Catalonia
Association football defenders
Segunda División players
Segunda División B players
RCD Espanyol B footballers
UE Lleida players
Real Madrid Castilla footballers
CD Aurrerá de Vitoria footballers
Terrassa FC footballers
UDA Gramenet footballers
CF Badalona players
Girona FC players
CF Sporting Mahonés players
Spain youth international footballers
FC Ascó players